The Adulteress (Italian: L'adultera) is a 1946 Italian melodrama film directed by Duilio Coletti and starring Clara Calamai, Roldano Lupi and Carlo Ninchi. It was shot at the Scalera Studios in Rome. Calamai received the Nastro d'Argento for Best Actress for her performance.

Cast
 Clara Calamai as Velca  
 Roldano Lupi as Tarquinio  
 Carlo Ninchi as Dante Viburzi  
 Delia Brandi as Quirina  
 Dino Di Luca as Egidio Viburzi  
 Carlo Romano as Il fattore  
  as Il padre di Velca  
 Gualtiero Tumiati as Il vecchio indovino  
 Ernesto Bianchi as Un contadino  
 Bianca Avalise as Lucia 
 Cesare Polacco as Il vecchio dei gioielli  
 Eugenio Duse as Il compratore dei terreni  
 Giovanni Onorato as Un contadino sul biroccio  
  as Un ospite alla festa di battesimo 
 Alfredo Martinelli as  Un altro ospite alla festa di battesimo

References

Bibliography 
 Moliterno, Gino. Historical Dictionary of Italian Cinema. Scarecrow Press, 2008.

External links 

1946 films
Italian drama films
1946 drama films
1940s Italian-language films
Films directed by Duilio Coletti
Italian films based on plays
Films shot at Scalera Studios
Italian black-and-white films
Films scored by Enzo Masetti
1940s Italian films